Faehlmann is an Estonian surname of German origin that may refer to

Andreas Faehlmann  (1898–1943), Estonian aviation engineer and sailor
Friedrich Robert Faehlmann (1798–1850), Estonian philologist and physician
Georg Faehlmann (1895–1975), Estonian sailor, brother of Andreas

German-language surnames